Little One may refer to:

Literature
 The Little One (book)

Music
The Little Ones (band), a band based in Los Angeles, California
"Little One" (Highly Suspect song), 2016
"Little One" (1956 song), a Cole Porter/Bing Crosby song written for the film High Society
"Little One" (Beck song), a 2002 song by Beck from the album Sea Change
"Little One", a 2004 song by Elliott Smith from the album From a Basement on the Hill 
"Little One" (Bilal song), 2010
Little One Tour, a 2011 concert tour by Bilal

Film
Little One (film), a 2012 South African film directed by Darrell Roodt
The Little Ones, a 1965 British family comedy film

See also
The Small One (book), a 1947 Christmas novelette written by Charles Tazewell
The Small One (album), a 1947 album by Bing Crosby of the Tazewell story
The Small One, a 1978 animated featurette by Walt Disney Productions
My Little One (disambiguation)
Big One (disambiguation)